Phytoecia subannularis is a species of beetle in the family Cerambycidae. It was described by Maurice Pic in 1901. It is known from Turkey and Syria.

References

Phytoecia
Beetles described in 1901